Agustín Maximiliano Rogel Paita (born 17 October 1997) is a Uruguayan professional footballer who plays as a centre-back for Bundesliga club Hertha BSC and the Uruguay national team.

Club career
Rogel started his career at Nacional. After being involved in the first team in the 2015–16 pre-season, he picked up a meniscus injury which required an operation and ruled him out for six months. He made his debut for the first team as a substitute in the Copa Libertadores against Venezuelan side Zulia in a 1–0 defeat on 15 March 2016. He made his league debut in 2016. On 3 May 2018, Rogel's agent said that Rogel had rejected a contract offer from English side Leeds United.

On 30 August 2018, Rogel signed a four-year contract with Russian club Krylia Sovetov Samara.

On 19 July 2019, Rogel signed a four-year contract with French club Toulouse. On 19 February 2021, he moved to Argentine Primera División side Estudiantes de La Plata, on a loan deal until the end of the season. On 13 January 2022, his contract with his parent club Toulouse was terminated.

On 17 January 2022, Rogel returned to Estudiantes de La Plata on a one-year contract.

On 31 August 2022, Rogel joined Bundesliga club Hertha BSC on a four-year deal until June 2026.

International career
Rogel is a former Uruguayan youth international. He was part of under-20 team which won the 2017 South American U-20 Championship.

In September 2022, Rogel was called up to the Uruguay national team for the first time. He made his debut on 23 September 2022 in a 1–0 defeat against Iran.

Career statistics

International

Honours
Uruguay U20
 South American Youth Football Championship: 2017

References

External links

Profile at the Hertha BSC website
 

1997 births
Living people
Footballers from Montevideo
Uruguayan footballers
Uruguay under-20 international footballers
Uruguay international footballers
Association football defenders
Club Nacional de Football players
PFC Krylia Sovetov Samara players
Toulouse FC players
Estudiantes de La Plata footballers
Hertha BSC players
Uruguayan Primera División players
Russian Premier League players
Ligue 1 players
Championnat National 3 players
Argentine Primera División players
Uruguayan expatriate footballers
Uruguayan expatriate sportspeople in Russia
Uruguayan expatriate sportspeople in France
Uruguayan expatriate sportspeople in Argentina
Uruguayan expatriate sportspeople in Germany
Expatriate footballers in Russia
Expatriate footballers in France
Expatriate footballers in Argentina
Expatriate footballers in Germany